The discography of American alternative rock band Needtobreathe consists of eight studio albums, four live albums, twelve extended plays and more than forty singles. Four of the albums charted in the Billboard 200 with Rivers in the Wasteland reaching No. 3. The band was signed to Atlantic Records until 2020, when they released Out of Body and subsequent music under the Elektra Records label. Needtobreathe has been classified as a Christian rock act, with distributors Sparrow Records and Word Records.

Albums

Independent albums

Studio albums

Live albums

Extended plays

Singles

Other charted songs

Videography

Music videos

Notes

References

External links
 

Discographies of American artists
Rock music group discographies
Christian music discographies